Pacoima Wash,  long, is a major tributary of the Tujunga Wash, itself a tributary of the Los Angeles River, in the San Fernando Valley of Los Angeles County, California.
 
The stream begins at Mount Gleason, in the western San Gabriel Mountains of the Angeles National Forest. The upper reaches, sometimes known as Pacoima Creek, flow through Pacoima Canyon as a rapid mountain stream. It then reaches the Pacoima Dam Reservoir in the western San Gabriel Mountains of the Angeles National Forest and proceeds south in a free-flowing stream alongside Pacoima Trail Road. Below the dam, it is generally known as the Pacoima Wash. From there, it joins several other unnamed streams that drain the nearby mountains, collecting at Lopez Dam. South of that dam, Pacoima Wash is encased in a concrete flood control channel, and travels south from Kagel Canyon in Sylmar though San Fernando, Pacoima, Mission Hills, Panorama City, and Van Nuys.

History
In 1911, the developers of the Van Nuys townsite altered the Pacoima Wash from Sherman Way to the Los Angeles River, for 3 miles by adding a 50’ wide street/flood channel.

Years of flooding downstream followed, and Van Nuys flooded in the great Los Angeles Flood of 1938.

In the 1950’s many drastic efforts were made to protect residents along the Pacoima Wash.

Just after flowing below Interstate 5, the stream is diverted to the Pacoima Diversion Channel, joining Tujunga Wash further upstream. The Pacoima Wash Headworks were created where the Interstate 5 interchange is for settling of high flood volumes. The threat of flooding was diminished greatly. 41 years later, Congressman Tony Cardenas won funding to turn the headworks, bare ground used only to settle flood volumes, into parkland. The earlier attempts to channelize the wash from the Pacoima Headworks south were left alone, and the channel was redirected closer to Van Nuys Bl.

Because of the flash floods in the Pacoima Wash, flooding in Van Nuys was an issue every year. In the great 1938 Los Angeles rains and flood, many parts of Van Nuys flooded severely.  

Through the 1960’s, Van Nuys Elementary School kept a pontoon bridge for students to cross the flood channel when it flooded. Parts of the original streambed disappeared and can be traced behind the YMCA. The Knights of Columbus is shoehorned in a 100 foot wide channel.

The flooding issues remained until the 1950’s when the Pacoima Diversion Channel took the stream east from Laurel Canyon and the I 5-CA 118 interchange to the Tujunga Wash. several miles of Pacoima Wash remained, drained by several miles of adjoining storm drains. And from Vanowen to the Los Angeles River, the historic Pacoima Wash disappears.

In 1991, the section between Lassen Street and Parthenia Street was one of the last sections of natural stream beds in the San Fernando Valley to be made a concrete channel.

In 2007, the wash was cleaned up after being cited as a fertile breeding ground for mosquitoes carrying the West Nile virus.

Pacoima Wash has been the site of several rescues of people, mostly of children and teenagers trapped in the spring runoff. Incidents occurred in 1985, 1993, 1995, 1996, 1998, and 2006.

There have been efforts to create a greenway along the Wash connecting the communities of the Northeast San Fernando Valley. In 2004 the Pacoima Wash Greenway Master Plan was created by Department of Landscape Architecture at Cal Poly Pomona which focuses on the portion of the Wash within the City of San Fernando.

In 2008, environmental non-profit Pacoima Beautiful started the Pacoima Wash initiative. The goal of this project is to create a linear greenway composed of bike lanes and a walking path along a 12-mile stretch of the Wash between the Pacoima Dam in Sylmar and the Tujunga Wash in Arleta. The Pacoima Wash Vision Plan, which covers the Sylmar and Pacoima portions of the Wash was produced in 2011. An addendum to the plan focusing on the Arleta portion of the Wash is currently being produced.

Several new parks along the Wash are in various stages of completion. 8th Street Park is a 4.75 acre park in the City of San Fernando which will be completed in spring of 2014. The city of Los Angeles is creating preliminary designs for a park along the Wash between El Dorado and Telfair Street.

Crossings and tributaries
From mouth to source (year built in parentheses):

Van Nuys Boulevard (1948)
Saticoy Street (1933)
Raymer Street
Railroad: Union Pacific Coast Line
Unnamed channel departs
Roscoe Boulevard (1957)
Chase Street [Pedestrian Bridge]
Parthenia Street
Rayen Street (1996)
Nordhoff Street
Tupper Street [Pedestrian Bridge]
Plummer Street
Lassen Street
Parking lot
Woodman Avenue
Devonshire Street and Pacoima Spreading Grounds
Arleta Avenue 
Pacoima Diversion Channel departs
Interstate 5 Golden State Freeway and Paxton Street ramps (1963 and 1976)
Laurel Canyon Boulevard (1954)
State Route 118 Ronald Reagan Freeway (1969)
San Jose Street/Haddon Avenue [Pedestrian Bridge]
San Fernando Road (1925)
Railroad: Metrolink Antelope Valley Line
Bradley Avenue/4th Street (1954)
5th Street (1953)
Glenoaks Boulevard (1953)
Foothill Boulevard (1923)
Interstate 210 Foothill Freeway (1975)
Lopez Dam
Harding Street
Gavina Avenue
Pacoima Trail Road and private roads

References

External links
 City of San Fernando: Pacoima Wash Project
 Pacoima Beautiful.org: Pacoima Wash Vision Plan Initiative

Rivers of Los Angeles County, California
Tributaries of the Los Angeles River
Washes of California
San Gabriel Mountains
Geography of the San Fernando Valley
Mission Hills, Los Angeles
Pacoima, Los Angeles
Panorama City, Los Angeles
San Fernando, California
Sylmar, Los Angeles
Van Nuys, Los Angeles
Rivers of Southern California